Paul Isberg (September 2, 1882 in Helsingborg, Scania – March 5, 1955) was a Swedish sailor who competed in the 1912 Summer Olympics. He was a crew member of the Swedish boat Kitty, which won the gold medal in the 10 metre class and was the first Swedish boat and crew to win in sailing at the Olympics.

His daughter Kerstin Isberg was a Swedish swimmer.

References

External links
profile

1882 births
1955 deaths
Sportspeople from Helsingborg
Swedish male sailors (sport)
Sailors at the 1912 Summer Olympics – 10 Metre
Olympic sailors of Sweden
Olympic gold medalists for Sweden
Olympic medalists in sailing
Medalists at the 1912 Summer Olympics
20th-century Swedish people